Kiasejmahaleh (also Romanized as Kīāsejmaḩaleh) is a village in Machian Rural District, Kelachay District, Rudsar County, Gilan Province, Iran. At the 2017 census, its population was 108, in 37 families.

References 

Populated places in Rudsar County